The three teams in this group played against each other on a home-and-away basis. The group winner Northern Ireland qualified for the sixth FIFA World Cup held in Sweden.

The 15 January 1958 fixture of Italy at Northern Ireland was originally scheduled for 4 December 1957 but heavy fog in London prevented the referee (Istvan Zsolt, manager of the Budapest Opera House) from arriving for the match in time. The fixture was postponed but the match continued as a friendly, and ended in a 2-2 draw and a riot as the crowd (infuriated by the postponement and quite rough play from some Italian players) invaded the pitch. The 'friendly' match was dubbed the 'Battle of Belfast'. Danny Blanchflower, Northern Ireland captain at the time, helped save the situation by ordering his players to escort their Italian counterparts off the field while the police dealt with the crowd.

Table

Matches

References

External links
FIFA official page
RSSSF - 1958 World Cup Qualification
Allworldcup

8
1956–57 in Portuguese football
1957–58 in Portuguese football
1956–57 in Italian football
1957–58 in Italian football
1956–57 in Northern Ireland association football
Northern Ireland at the 1958 FIFA World Cup